Lee Si-won (born August 29, 1987) is a South Korean actress.

Personal life 
Lee will be attending a wedding ceremony with her non-celebrity boyfriend. With Lee's boyfriend as a doctor Who is an alumnus of Seoul National University And will have a wedding at the end of June 2021.

Filmography

Film

Television series

Television shows

References

External links 
 
 
 

1987 births
Living people
South Korean film actresses
South Korean television actresses
Seoul National University alumni